John Henry Coleman (born 3 March 1946) is an English former professional footballer who played as a full-back or as a half-back in the Football League for Mansfield Town and York City, in non-League football for Ilkeston Town, and was on the books of Nottingham Forest without making a league appearance.

References

1946 births
Living people
People from Hucknall
Footballers from Nottinghamshire
English footballers
Association football fullbacks
Association football midfielders
Nottingham Forest F.C. players
Mansfield Town F.C. players
York City F.C. players
Ilkeston Town F.C. (1945) players
English Football League players